Allar Levandi (born 28 December 1965) is an Estonian nordic combined skier who competed during the late 1980s and early 1990s under two different nations in three straight Winter Olympic Games (1988: Soviet Union, 1992 and 1994: Estonia). He trained at Dynamo in Tallinn when Estonia was under Soviet rule in the late 1980s.

He won a bronze in the 15 km individual at the 1988 Winter Olympics in Calgary. Levandi also won a bronze medal in the 3 x 10 km team event at the 1987 FIS Nordic World Ski Championships in Oberstdorf.

Personal life
He is married to Anna Kondrashova, a retired competitive figure skater and a current figure skating coach and choreographer.

References

External links

 
 
 
 

1965 births
Living people
Estonian male Nordic combined skiers
Soviet male Nordic combined skiers
Nordic combined skiers at the 1988 Winter Olympics
Nordic combined skiers at the 1992 Winter Olympics
Nordic combined skiers at the 1994 Winter Olympics
Olympic Nordic combined skiers of Estonia
Olympic Nordic combined skiers of the Soviet Union
Olympic bronze medalists for the Soviet Union
Sportspeople from Tallinn
Olympic medalists in Nordic combined
FIS Nordic World Ski Championships medalists in Nordic combined
Medalists at the 1988 Winter Olympics